This is a list of electoral results for the Division of Dundas in Australian federal elections from the division's creation in 1977 until its abolition in 1993.

Members

Election results

Elections in the 1990s

1990

Elections in the 1980s

1987

1984

1983

1980

Elections in the 1970s

1977

References

 Australian Electoral Commission. Federal election results
 Carr, Adam. Psephos

Australian federal electoral results by division